Naken Kyrykbaev (29 August 1975 – 5 April 2015) was a Kazakh international footballer who played as a goalkeeper for FC Taraz and the national team. He continues to hold the Taraz record for penalty kick defense. He moved to coaching in 2012.

References

1975 births
2015 deaths
Kazakhstani footballers
Kazakhstan international footballers
FC Taraz players
Association football goalkeepers
Footballers at the 1998 Asian Games
Asian Games competitors for Kazakhstan